Frank Vatrano (born March 14, 1994) is an American professional ice hockey player for the Anaheim Ducks of the National Hockey League (NHL). He has previously played for the Boston Bruins, Florida Panthers, and New York Rangers.

Playing career

Amateur
Vatrano grew up in East Longmeadow, Massachusetts. As a youth, he played in the 2006 Quebec International Pee-Wee Hockey Tournament with the Minuteman Flames minor ice hockey team. He attended Cathedral High School, and later transferred to Pioneer High School in Ann Arbor, Michigan to play in the U.S. National Team Development Program. He played for the Boston Jr. Bruins in 2009–10 scoring eight goals before playing within the U.S. National Development Team Program. After originally committing to Boston College, Vatrano opted to return to the Boston Jr. Bruins before starting his collegiate career the following season with the University of Massachusetts Amherst. He forwent his senior year in 2014 to pursue professional career, signing a three-year entry level contract with the Boston Bruins on March 12, 2015. He signed an amateur tryout contract with AHL affiliate, the Providence Bruins making his professional debut to finish out the 2014–15 season.

Professional

Boston Bruins
After attending his first Bruins training camp, Vatrano was reassigned to the Providence Bruins to begin his rookie season. Vatrano opened the 2015–16 season, leading the AHL in goal scoring with 10 goals in as many games, earning rookie of the month honors. His quick ascension was realised when he subsequently received his first NHL recall with the Bruins on November 6, 2015. On November 7, 2015, Vatrano made his NHL debut, and scored his first regular season NHL goal for the Bruins against their long-time rivals, the Montreal Canadiens in a 4–2 road game defeat. Vatrano would later go on to score 2 goals against the Detroit Red Wings including an overtime game winner.
On December 18, 2015, Vatrano scored his first NHL hat trick with the Bruins against the Pittsburgh Penguins, with the first, fifth, and sixth Bruins goals for a 6–2 road victory.

At the end of the 2015–16 AHL season, he finished with 36 goals and 19 assists for a total of 55 points in 36 games. He also had three hat tricks. On April 14, 2016, the AHL announced San Antonio Rampage rookie Mikko Rantanen and him, shared the Dudley "Red" Garrett Memorial Award as the AHL’s outstanding rookie for the 2015–16 season.

For the start of the 2016–17 Boston Bruins season, Vatrano had suffered an unexpected injury to his left foot due to torn ligaments. As a result, Vatrano missed the Bruins' training camp and pre-season games for his recovery.  His first game for the Bruins in the 2016–17 season was on December 22, 2016, on the road against the Florida Panthers and with 2:09 elapsed in the second period, Vatrano scored the first Bruins goal en route to a 3–1 road victory against the Panthers.

Florida Panthers
On February 22, 2018, the Bruins traded Vatrano to the Florida Panthers in exchange for a third-round pick in the 2018 NHL Entry Draft. Immediately following the trade, it was revealed that Vatrano was expected to miss two weeks to recover from an ankle injury. He scored in his debut with the Panthers on March 10, ending his 13-game goalless drought, to help the team record their eighth straight home win. Vatrano's outstanding play earned him a temporary promotion from the third line to the second line to play with Vincent Trocheck and Jonathan Huberdeau. Despite his efforts, the Panthers were eliminated from playoff contention with a 43–30–8 record on April 7. Vatrano ended the regular season with seven goals and three assists through 41 games with the Panthers and Boston Bruins. Following the Panther's elimination, Vatrano signed a one-year contract to remain with the team on June 29, 2018.

Vatrano returned to the Panthers for the 2018–19 season as their expected third line winger alongside center Jared McCann and winger Denis Malgin. The line had played together shortly during the previous season but never for long amounts of time. Malgin was eventually replaced with Jonathan Huberdeau. By January 15, Vatrano reached new career-highs in goals and points while averaging 14:11 of ice time per game. His 12 even-strength goals were also tied for the team lead. His play earned him a promotion to the Panther's top line as a winger to Aleksander Barkov and Evgenii Dadonov. Upon joining this line, he accumulated three goals and three assists in four games. He also set a new NHL career high with four points in one game as the Panthers beat the San Jose Sharks on January 21. In his following 10 games on that line, Vatrano led the team in goals, points, and shots on goal while also pacing all team forwards with 44 blocked shots. He continued to lead the team in scoring throughout February with an NHL career-high 20 goals and 33 points through 59 games. Vatrano's outstanding play earned him a three-year contract extension on February 25. Once Malgin returned to the lineup on March 25, Vatrano reunited with the centre and Riley Sheahan on the third line. The following game, Vatrano tallied his 23rd goal of the season, continue adding to his new-career high, in his 200th career NHL game. Vatrano concluded his second season with the team with 24 goals and 15 assists for 39 points.

New York Rangers
On March 16, 2022, Vatrano was traded by the Panthers to the New York Rangers in exchange for a 2022 fourth-round pick. He immediately found chemistry with the Rangers, notching 8 goals and 13 points through 22 appearances to close out the regular season. In the playoffs, he helped the Rangers advance to the Conference Finals, contributing with 5 goals and 13 points through 20 post-season games.

Anaheim Ducks
As a free agent from the Rangers, Vatrano was signed to a three-year, $10.95 million contract with the Anaheim Ducks on July 13, 2022.

Career statistics

Regular season and playoffs

International

References

External links
 

1994 births
Living people
American people of Italian descent
Anaheim Ducks players
Boston Bruins players
Florida Panthers players
Ice hockey players from Massachusetts
New York Rangers players
Providence Bruins players
UMass Minutemen ice hockey players
Undrafted National Hockey League players
USA Hockey National Team Development Program players
American men's ice hockey centers